The 19023 / 19024 Firozpur Janta Express was an Express train belonging to Indian Railways that run between  and Firozpur Cantonment in India.

It operated as train number 19023 from Mumbai Central to Firozpur Cantonment and as train number 19024 in the reverse direction, serving the states of Maharashtra, Gujarat, Madhya Pradesh, Rajasthan, Uttar Pradesh, Haryana, Delhi & Punjab.

It was one of the Janta series of trains thus it has only non-air-conditioned coaches. Janata means "common people" in Devanagari.

Coaches

The 19023/19024 Firozpur Janta Express had 8 Sleeper class & 6 General Unreserved coaches. It frequently carries a couple of High Capacity Parcel Van coaches.

As with most train services in India, coach composition may be amended at the discretion of Indian Railways depending on demand.

Service

The 19023 Firozpur Janta Express covered the distance of 1772 kilometres in 38 hours 55 mins (45.53 km/hr) & 39 hours as 19024 Firozpur Janta Express (45.38 km/hr).

Timetable

 19023 Firozpur Janta Express leaved Mumbai Central every day at 07:25 hrs IST and reaches Firozpur Cantonment at 22:20 hrs IST the next day.
 19024 Firozpur Janta Express leaved Firozpur Cantonment every day at 05:00 hrs IST and reaches Mumbai Central at 19:35 hrs IST the next day.

References 

Transport in Firozpur
Transport in Mumbai
Railway services introduced in 1956
Express trains in India
Rail transport in Maharashtra
Rail transport in Gujarat
Rail transport in Madhya Pradesh
Rail transport in Rajasthan
Rail transport in Haryana
Rail transport in Punjab, India
Named passenger trains of India